Deng Qingming (born 16 March 1966) is a Chinese People's Liberation Army Astronaut Corps (PLAAC) taikonaut selected as part of the Shenzhou program.

Biography 
He was born in the Yihuang County, Jiangxi province of China. A fighter pilot in the People's Liberation Army Air Force, he was selected to be an astronaut in 1998.

He was announced as a backup member of Shenzhou 9, Shenzhou 10, Shenzhou 11 and Shenzhou 12 before finally being selected as one of the three crew members of Shenzhou 15 in November 2022.

See also
List of Chinese astronauts

References

Deng Qingming at the Encyclopedia Astronautica. Accessed 23 July 2005.
Spacefacts biography of Deng Qingming

Shenzhou program astronauts
People's Liberation Army Astronaut Corps
Living people
People's Liberation Army Air Force personnel
1966 births